Rockhill Barracks was an Irish Army barracks located in Letterkenny, County Donegal. The Barracks was forced to close due to the 2008 economic meltdown.

History
Rockhill House is a 30-room period building originally built as a manor house in the 17th century for the gentry. Captain Thomas Chambers is the earliest recorded occupier of the house in 1660. The present structure dates from 1824 and is a listed building. Rockhill House was occupied by The Irregulars during the Irish Civil War. They were removed from the building by a pro-treaty crowd who were led by Letterkenny native James McMonagle. Rockhill House which houses the barracks was later privately owned by Sir Charles John Stewart. His two sons were killed during World War I. He sold the building in October 1936, through selling agent John King Robinson, due to the fear of attacks from the Irish Republican Army.

During years of vacancy the building was used as a Preparatory Irish College. The premises was used by The 24th Battalion from 1969 to 1973. Rockhill also hosted military combatants before members of the "B" company of the 28th Infantry settled there in 1973. The then Taoiseach, Jack Lynch, deployed Irish troops to the border during The Troubles in Northern Ireland.

There is evidence that golf was played at Rockhill before the 20th century, long before Letterkenny Golf Club was established in 1913. A steward wrote to his master stating that golf was being played on the land of Major General ACH Stewart. In a letter he stated "Mr Chambers, Manager of the Ulster Bank, Dr Carre and a few others been playing golf on the lawn starting at McDaid's old lodge and going across into the Fort Field".

Closure

Due to the 2008 Budget cutbacks on military spending the barracks was forced to close. 135 personnel moved to Finner Camp in Ballyshannon on 31 January 2009. Willie O'Dea, Minister for Defence, who defended the closure, said "There were too many army barracks for an army and a country of Ireland's size". Local people protested and stated that "the Government was walking on the people and the proposals would mean the loss of €6.5 million to the local economy". Dessie Larkin, a local councillor, said "I think it is a huge mistake to leave the north of the county without an army presence. The county would be cut off if it was blown up. What do people do in north Donegal now if there is a flooding crisis or other disaster?" He recalled how his father James (Big Jim) Larkin was presented with a membership card for the officer's mass. The Sunday mass was only part of what the barracks meant to the community. "For people living in Bomany, Oldtown and New Mills it was a God send", he said.

Protest
A protest march was held in Letterkenny on Saturday 15 November 2008 in objection to the barracks closure. It began at the Bus Éireann depot at 1.30pm and came to a climax at the Market Square. The protest was organised by the Donegal Steering Group Against Barrack Closures who include former Rockhill service personnel. Fine Gael politician Dinny McGinley was forced to leave the Dáil after he caused a row with Willie O'Dea. When O'Dea failed to answer McGinley's request for him to visit Donegal, the Donegal TD demanded that he prove whether he is "a man or a mouse". Leas Ceann Comhairle, Brendan Howlin asked McGinley to leave when he repeatedly shouted at O'Dea.

An open day was held at the barracks on 14 January 2009 and a final mass on 18 January was celebrated by Army Chaplain, Fr. Alan Ward. The open day provided soldiers and members of the general public with an opportunity to remember times gone by. On Wednesday, 28 January, soldiers marched down the Barracks avenue for the last time before proceeding to march from the Courthouse to the Library on the town's Main Street.

Proposals
While there have been no definitive plans made for Rockhill Estate, suggested proposals have included the following:

Neil Clarke, a former Green Party politician, has suggested using the Rockhill site as a boot camp for suitable prisoners. He stated that the inmates would receive a "short, sharp, shock" by serving a short sentence while being trained and educated for the rest of their lives.
Former commanding officer Lieutenant-Colonel Declan O'Carroll has suggested that Rockhill House could be used as a County Museum due to the lack of space at the Donegal County Museum on the High Road.
Rockhill House Heritage Association, a not-for-profit group, have been campaigning since 2009 to have Rockhill properly protected and developed so as to allow the property gain its full potential for the benefit of the people of County Donegal. They see its development as a flagship tourism project as the best option to begin to achieve that aim.

On 25 July 2014, it was announced that Rockhill House would be sold at public auction during August 2014. It was acquired by a local businessman, John Moloy, for €670,000.

Publications
Lt.-Col. Declan O'Carroll, commanding officer at the barracks from 1981 to 1983, 1984 to 1986 and 1992 to 1993, published his 62-page book "Rockhill House – A History" in 1984. It was published by Defences Forces Printing Press and it was revised in 1994.

References

External links
 Irish Defence Forces Statement

Barracks in the Republic of Ireland
Buildings and structures in Letterkenny
Irish military bases